"Burning Love" is a 1972 song by Elvis Presley. It may also refer to:

 Burning love, a common name for the plant Lychnis chalcedonica.

Film and TV
 "Burning Love" (Arrested Development), an episode of the TV comedy series Arrested Development
 Burning Love (film), a 2015 mockumentary comedy film
 Burning Love (TV series), an American scripted comedy series

Music
 Burning Love (band), a hardcore punk band from Toronto, Ontario, Canada
 Burning Love and Hits from His Movies, Volume 2, a 1972 compilation album by Elvis Presley
 "Burning Love", a song by Kix from the album Cool Kids, 1983
 "Burnin Love", a song by Dido from the album Safe Trip Home, 2008